Harry Giddings Jr. (May 18, 1884 – June 15, 1949) was a Canadian Horse Racing Hall of Fame owner, breeder, and trainer of thoroughbred racehorses. He was born in Trafalgar Township in Halton County, Ontario now at the outskirts of the town of Oakville. Raised on a horse breeding farm, he learned about training Thoroughbreds from childhood and by 1907 was successful enough to have one of his horses compete in the Queen's Plate, Canada's most prestigious horse race first run in 1860. Between 1911 and 1942, Harry Giddings would win a record eight editions of the Queen's Plate. Sixty-six years later in 2008 Roger Attfield tied the record. In addition to his Queen's Plates, Giddings Jr. won ten of the two other Canadian Classic Races which today constitute the Canadian Triple Crown series.

Harry Giddings Jr. maintained a stud farm near Oakville, and owned four of his eight Queen's Plate winners. He trained horses for other owners and was active in the business until his death in 1949.

References 

1884 births
1949 deaths
Animal sportspeople from Ontario
Canadian Horse Racing Hall of Fame inductees
Canadian horse trainers
Canadian racehorse owners and breeders
Owners of King's Plate winners